Grevillea pauciflora, commonly known as the few-flowered grevillea,<ref name=FB>{{FloraBase|name=Grevillea pauciflora|id=2060}}</ref> or as Port Lincoln grevillea in South Australia, is a species of flowering plant in the family Proteaceae and is endemic to the south of continental Australia. It is an erect to straggly or spreading shrub with linear to narrowly wedge-shaped leaves and red or orange flowers with a red or orange style.

TaxonomyGrevillea pauciflora was first formally described in 1810 by Robert Brown in Transactions of the Linnean Society of London. The specific epithet (pauciflora) means "few-flowered". The specific epithet pauciflora, referring the Latin term for 'few flowered'.D. Gledhill 

In 1986, Donald McGillivray described two subspecies in New Names in Grevillea (Proteaceae) and in 1996 William Robert Barker described a third subspecies in the Journal of the Adelaide Botanic Gardens, and the names are accepted by the Australian Plant Census:

Distribution and habitatGrevillea pauciflora grows in sandy soil. Subspecies leptophylla is only known on the Eyre Peninsula in South Australia, where it is found north and north-west of Cummins, but subsp. pauciflora is widespread on the Eyre and Yorke Peninsulas and on Kangaroo Island. Subspecies psilophylla is found in near-coastal areas of Western Australia from east of Esperance to Point Malcolm near Israelite Bay and subspecies saxatilis'' only grows in Cape Arid National Park.

See also
 List of Grevillea species

References

pauciflora
Endemic flora of Western Australia
Eudicots of Western Australia
Proteales of Australia
Taxa named by Robert Brown (botanist, born 1773)